The men's national under-19 basketball team of the Philippines represents the country in junior men's under-18 and under-19 FIBA tournaments. It is governed by the Samahang Basketbol ng Pilipinas.

The team has won 6 FIBA Asia Under-18 Championships making them second with the most wins in the tournament next to China.

The team is also the perennial powerhouse at Southeast Asia, representing the subzone in the FIBA Asia Under-18 Championship, except in 2000, 2002 and 2006. Since 2008, they haven't lost any single game at the SEABA Under-18 Championship, winning their fourth straight title and seventh overall since the subzone organized the tournament in 1996.

Current roster
Philippines roster at the 26th FIBA U18 Asian Championship:

Competitions

FIBA Under-19 World Championship

FIBA Asia Under-18 Championship

SEABA Under-18 Championship

Past rosters

2019 FIBA Under-19 Basketball World Cup
Philippines roster at the 14th FIBA Under-19 Basketball World Cup:

2018 FIBA Under-18 Asian Championship
Philippines roster at the 25th FIBA Under-18 Asian Championship:

2016 FIBA Asia Under-18 Championship
Philippines roster at the 24th FIBA Asia Under-18 Championship:

2016 SEABA Under-18 Championship
Philippines roster at the 10th SEABA Under-18 Championship:

2014 FIBA Asia Under-18 Championship
Philippines roster at the 23rd FIBA Asia Under-18 Championship:

2014 SEABA Under-18 Championship
Philippines roster at the 9th SEABA Under-18 Championship:

2012 FIBA Asia Under-18 Championship
Philippines roster at the 22nd FIBA Asia Under-18 Championship:

2012 SEABA Under-18 Championship
Philippines roster at the 8th SEABA Under-18 Championship:

2010 FIBA Asia Under-18 Championship
Philippines roster at the 21st FIBA Asia Under-18 Championship:

2010 SEABA Under-18 Championship
Philippines roster at the 7th SEABA Under-18 Championship:

2008 FIBA Asia Under-18 Championship
Philippines roster at the 20th FIBA Asia Under-18 Championship:

2008 SEABA Under-18 Championship
Philippines roster at the 6th SEABA Under-18 Championship:

2006 FIBA Asia Under-18 Championship
During the 2006 FIBA Asia Under-18 Championship held in Urumqi, China from September 1–9, 2006, the Philippines were still under the suspension slapped by FIBA, preventing the youth team to participate.

2006 SEABA Under-18 Championship
During the 2006 SEABA Under-18 Championship held in Segamat, Malaysia from June 28–30, 2006, the Philippines were still under the suspension slapped by FIBA, preventing the youth team to participate.

2004 FIBA Asia Under-18 Championship
Philippines roster at the 18th FIBA Asia Under-18 Championship:

2004 SEABA Under-18 Championship
Philippines roster at the 4th SEABA Under-18 Championship:

2002 ABC Under-18 Championship
During the 2002 ABC Under-18 Championship held in Kuwait City, Kuwait from December 16–26, 2002, the Philippines failed to get past the SEABA qualifiers where it ended a dismal fourth place, preventing the youth team to participate.

2002 SEABA Under-18 Championship
Philippines roster at the 3rd SEABA Under-18 Championship:

2000 ABC Under-18 Championship
During the 2000 ABC Under-18 Championship held in Kuala Lumpur, Malaysia from July 18–27, 2000, the Philippines were not able to join in the tournament; they participated instead at the 2000 ABC Under-20 Championship in Qatar.

1998 ABC Under-18 Championship

1998 SEABA Under-18 Championship

1996 ABC Under-18 Championship
Philippines roster at the 14th ABC Under-18 Championship:

1996 SEABA Under-18 Championship
Philippines roster at the 1st SEABA Under-18 Championship:

1995 ABC Under-18 Championship

1992 ABC Under-18 Championship
Philippines roster at the 12th ABC Under-18 Championship:

1990 ABC Under-18 Championship
Philippines roster at the 11th ABC Under-18 Championship:

1989 ABC Under-18 Championship
Philippines roster at the 10th ABC Under-18 Championship:

References

External links
Samahang Basketbol ng Pilipinas Official Website
Nokia-RP Youth Team Official Website

under
Men's national under-19 basketball teams